Miss & Mr Teen India also called Alee Club Miss & Mr Teen India is the oldest pageant with holding Limca Book of Records for teenagers in India, which was started in the year 1997, that is the platform to the young boys and girls between 13 and 19 years of age to showcase their talent in front of the world.

The first pageant was organized on 10 August 1997 at the Talkatora Stadium, New Delhi. The first winners of the pageant were Rushali crowned as Miss Teen India 1997 and Umesh crowned as Mr. Teen India 1997. The Reigning Alee Club 24th Miss Teen India is Rifkah Das Gupta and Alee Club 24th Mr Teen India is Dheeren Pathania.

Winners

References 

1997 establishments in India